William Banister was a missionary of the Anglican Church.

He was born in Walton-le-Dale on 31 May 1855, educated at the Church Missionary Society College, Islington and ordained in 1879. He was curate at Balderstone, Lancashire before heading to China as a missionary, rising in time to be Archdeacon of Hong Kong. In 1909 he became Bishop of Kwangsi-Hunan  China, a post he held until his retirement in 1923. He died on 26 February 1928

Notes

1855 births
People from Walton-le-Dale
Archdeacons of Hong Kong
Anglican missionary bishops in China
1928 deaths
Alumni of the Church Missionary Society College, Islington
19th-century Anglican bishops in China
Anglican bishops of Kwangsi-Hunan